Kronos Digital Entertainment was an American computer animation and video game developer founded by Stan Liu in 1992. They first began to develop original properties, beginning with their visually appealing early 3D fighting games, Criticom, Dark Rift and Cardinal Syn (referred to as the "Trilogy of Terror" by one gaming journalist). The organization later gained greater critical and commercial success for the Fear Effect series with Eidos, although Kronos retained all rights to the franchise. Kronos was busy developing the third installment in that series, Fear Effect Inferno, when publisher Eidos discontinued funding for the project following a major restructuring of their budget. The developer then shopped it around to other publishers but were unable to secure another deal to get the game finished. The company disbanded soon after, with Fear Effect 2: Retro Helix being their final released game.

Games developed

Animation

References

External links
 
 Interview with Stan Liu, founder of Kronos, at Gamecritics.com

Defunct video game companies of the United States
Video game development companies
Technology companies based in Greater Los Angeles
Companies based in Pasadena, California
Entertainment companies based in California
Video game companies established in 1992
Video game companies disestablished in 2002
1992 establishments in California
2002 disestablishments in California
Defunct companies based in Greater Los Angeles